The Trojan 750 is a trailer yacht made in New Zealand. It was designed by Ferris de Joux and Alan Warwick and built by Trojan Yachts Ltd from the late 1970s to the early 1980s.

It is on the large side for a trailer yacht, with room for 4–6 people.

In the forward cabin it has a double "V" berth; aft, two large single beds that go under the cockpit floor, normally equipped with a head in its own room just behind the "V" berth, and a small integrated galley with a sink, stove and storage behind that, joined to the centre board case.

Subsequent development
Pacific Trailer Yachts made an updated version of the trojan called the Eclipse 750, which had a NACA airfoil drop keel.

References

Sailing in New Zealand

Trailer sailers
Yachts